Kenneth Walsh is an American medical researcher specializing in the study of cardiovascular medicine. He is a Professor of Medicine at the University of Virginia School of Medicine. He was formerly a professor at Tufts University.
Along with Mark T. Nelson, he succeeded David Julius in 2021 as the co-editor of the peer-reviewed journal the Annual Review of Physiology.

Honors and awards
Walsh has received an Established Investigator Award from the American Heart Association and the Irwin F. Page Investigator Award from the Council on Arteriosclerosis. In 2011, he was one of five researchers named as Distinguished Scientists that year by the American Heart Association.

References

External links
Faculty page
Walsh Lab

Living people
Boston University faculty
Tufts University faculty
University of California, Berkeley alumni
Cardiovascular researchers
Year of birth missing (living people)
Annual Reviews (publisher) editors